Mehraj Din Malik (born in 1988) is an Indian politician and Aam Aadmi Party leader from Jammu and Kashmir. He is the AAP's first and only winning candidate in J&K as of 2022. He is an elected District Development Council (DDC) Councilor from the  Kahara constituency. On 17 October 2022, Aam Aadmi Party appointed him as co-chairman of J&K State Coordination Committee Aam Aadmi Party.

Career

Mehraj Malik began his political career after joining the AAP in 2013 and running as an Independent Candidate in the 2014 Assembly elections. In 2020, he won DDC polls as independent candidate with the margin of 3511 and was elected as a DDC Councillor for Kahara constituency. He is the first winning candidate of the Aam Aadmi Party from Jammu and Kashmir and, as of 2022, he is the only winning candidate of the party from Jammu and Kashmir.

On 17 October 2022, Aam Aadmi Party appointed him as co-chairman of J&K State Coordination Committee Aam Aadmi Party.

"Majja Majja Raj Karega" is a unique slogan which is raised whenever Mehraj Malik organised any rally.

Arrest
After protest against land eviction drive in Jammu, Mehraj Malik was taken into custody for questioning. The authorities detained Malik due to allegations that he delivered a speech at the location where a violent incident occurred.

References

Jammu and Kashmir politicians
People from Doda district
Aam Aadmi Party politicians
Living people
1988 births